The Saint-Leonard borough council is the local governing body of Saint-Leonard, a borough in the City of Montreal. The council consists of five members: the borough mayor (who also serves as a Montreal city councillor), two Montreal councillors elected for Saint-Leonard's electoral districts, and two borough councillors.

The borough council, like others in Montreal, is able to approve some contracts without seeking the approval of the Montreal executive committee or the Montreal city council. A Montreal Gazette article from May 2009 indicated that Saint-Leonard was paying more expenditures since dividing its management of parks and sports facilities into two twenty-year contracts. All members of the borough council are from Ensemble Montréal. Since the 2021 Montreal municipal election a majority of the borough council members are women.

Current members

Information on the borough councillors
Dominic Perri  holds a Bachelor of Science degree and a master's degree. He was also the chair of the Commission scolaire Jérôme-Le Royer from 1984 to 1987.

Suzanne De Larochellière is a retired Sûreté du Québec police officer who served for more than 30 years in the force.

Arij El Korbi is an ex-commissioner for the now defunct Commission scolaire de la Pointe-de-l’Île (CSPI). She is the first Tunisian woman to serve on the borough council in Saint-Leonard. She is the youngest member of the borough's delegation.

Angela Gentile is a businesswoman born and raised in Saint-Leonard. She was scheduled to run in the March 14, 2020 Saint-Leonard East by-election but the election was called off at the last minute due to the onset of the Covid-19 pandemic in Quebec.

References

Municipal government of Montreal
Saint-Leonard, Quebec